The 1927–28 season was Manchester City F.C.'s thirty-seventh season of league football and second season in the Football League Second Division, which they won for the fourth time in their history.

Team Kit

Football League Second Division

Results summary

Reports

FA Cup

Squad statistics

Squad
Appearances for competitive matches only

Scorers

See also
Manchester City F.C. seasons

References

External links
Extensive Manchester City statistics site

Manchester City F.C. seasons
Manchester City F.C.